The Painted Trail is a 1938 American Western film directed by Robert F. Hill and starring Tom Keene, Eleanor Stewart and LeRoy Mason.

Cast
 Tom Keene as Tom Gray posing as the Pecos Kid 
 Eleanor Stewart as Alice Banning 
 LeRoy Mason as Duke Prescott 
 Walter Long as Gang Leader Driscoll 
 Frank Campeau as U.S. Marshal G. Masters 
 James Eagles as Henchman Sammy
 Harry Harvey Sr. as U.S. Marshal Reed 
 Glenn Strange as Sheriff Ed 
 Ed Cassidy as U.S. Marshal Jackson 
 Ernie Adams as Henchman Nosey 
 Buzz Barton as Roulette Player

References

Bibliography
 Pitts, Michael R. Western Movies: A Guide to 5,105 Feature Films. McFarland, 2012.

External links
 

1938 films
1938 Western (genre) films
American Western (genre) films
American black-and-white films
1930s English-language films
Films directed by Robert F. Hill
Monogram Pictures films
Films directed by Robert Emmett Tansey
1930s American films